Tasmanian cushion plants are low growing, highly compact, woody, spreading mats that can grow up to 3 m in diameter, located mainly on the island of Tasmania. These mats are made up of tightly packed stems that grow at the same rate so that no apical rosettes protrude above the rest. The term cushion plant refers to a characteristic growth habit adopted by various species from a range of families to adapt to alpine and subalpine environments and areas of high latitude. They are adapted to grow in low nutrient areas and typically have deep taproots. Cushion plants are very slow growing and do not grow high above ground; mounds typically remain under 30 cm high. Underneath the living surface of the cushion, the plants either allow dead leaves to persist or produce non-photosynthetic material, resulting in an insulating effect.

Floristics of Tasmanian cushion plant community
Six families, including seven species, of cushion plants occur in Tasmania, and one additional family and species occur on Macquarie Island. Three additional families, including seven species, can adapt to the bolster habit, although not exclusively. The cushion plant growth habit is linked with drainage and the plant's ability to redirect water flow due to its growth pattern.

Evolution
The cushion plant is an example of convergent evolution. Unrelated species from a number of different families on separate continents have evolved the cushion form to adapt to similarly harsh environments.

Ecosystem function

Cushion plants have been shown to be a keystone species in the ecosystem in which they occur. For example, Azorella macquariensis is the only cushion-forming plant that occurs on Macquarie Island and it plays a vital role in the ecosystem as it makes up the major structural component of feldmark vegetation on the island. Cushion plants are also often considered "nurse species", as their presence is necessary in order for many other alpine species to become established. Cushion plants have been found to enhance species richness in areas with inherent impoverished local diversity. This effect is due to their low and compact growth form that alleviates severe alpine conditions.

Several Tasmanian cushion species have been found to have a surface temperature up to 10 °C greater than the ambient temperatures. The warmer temperatures allow the plants to continue to photosynthesize and grow in conditions that would otherwise inhibit such productivity. This substantially extends the growing season. In addition, a combination of the insulating properties of past growth under the surface of the cushion plants and the peaty soils in which they grow prevents temperatures around the roots dropping below -1 °C, which stops the roots from freezing. Surrounding plants species have adapted to not only benefit, but rely on these conditions the cushion plants provide to survive and grow, and are restricted to habitats in which cushions are present.

Threats
Three Tasmanian cushion plant species are listed as "under threat": Veronica ciliolata (subspecies fiordensis), Azorella macquariensis and Colobanthus pulvinatus.

Tasmanian endemic species, Veronica ciliolata subspecies fiordensis, is listed as vulnerable under both the Threatened Species Protection Act 1995 and the Environment Protection and Biodiversity Conservation Act 1999. The total population of mature individuals is estimated to be from 1500 to 2000. Threats include:

 Ski field expansion and other inappropriate development of the Ben Lomond plateau, in which the population is restricted,
 Climate change and an increase in temperatures that may negatively affect this species if suitable alpine habitat within possible dispersal range diminishes
 Stochastic events including landslides, drought, pathogens and inadvertent damage. The species' low range has made it particularly vulnerable if such events occur.

Azorella macquariensis, which is endemic to Macquarie Island, is listed as endangered under the Threatened Species Protection Act 1995 and Critically Endangered under the Environment Protection and Biodiversity Conservation Act 1999. Since 2008, this species has encountered substantial dieback and has had a catastrophic decline in population size. The cause of the dieback is unknown and under investigation. Once dead, the cushions may erode and as a result could have adverse impacts on the rest of feldmark vegetation due to its vital structural role in the ecosystem. Potential factors that threaten Azorella macquariensis include:

 Feldmark vegetation has been identified to be at risk to a change in climate if temperatures increase, drier soil conditions, less rainfall and increased frosts occur.
 The introduction of an alien species such as a plant, vertebrate, invertebrate or pathogen, could have detrimental effects on the species, either directly, through infection or competition, or indirectly, through habitat degradation.

Colobanthus pulvinatus is listed as rare under the Threatened Species Protection Act 1995.

References

Cushion plants
Flora of Tasmania
Flora of Macquarie Island